Ernst-Joachim Küppers (born 24 August 1942) is a German former swimmer. He competed in two events at the 1964 Summer Olympics. He won the silver medal in men's 4×100 metre medley relay.

References

1942 births
Living people
German male swimmers
Olympic swimmers of the United Team of Germany
Swimmers at the 1964 Summer Olympics
Sportspeople from Halle (Saale)
Olympic silver medalists for the United Team of Germany